Seksdagesløbet is a 1958 Danish drama film directed by Jørgen Roos and starring Poul Reichhardt.

Cast

Poul Reichhardt as Ivan Reimer
Lily Broberg as Lillian
Flemming Larsen as Kristian Reimer
Jørgen Reenberg as Otto Bertelsen
Preben Kaas as Benny Brun
Nino Orsini as Bandini
Ole Larsen as Torkild
Paul Hagen as Søren Kristensen
Bent Christensen s Kurt
Kjeld Petersen as Larsen
Judy Gringer as Tove
Vivi Bach as Marianne (as Vivi Bak)
Henny Lindorff Buckhøj as Karla
Valsø Holm as Karlas mand
Ulrik Neumann as Tilskuer
Kai Holm as Proprietær
Jørn Jeppesen as Arrangøren
Knud Schrøder as Banelægen
Mogens Brandt as Journalist Sivertsen
Ejner Federspiel as Tilskuer
Ellen Margrethe Stein as Tilskuer
Mimi Heinrich as Yrsa
Jørgen Buckhøj as Rockeren Erik
Guglielmo Inglese as Peppo
Frank Holms as Müller
Gustl Weishappel as Schmidt
Roger Maridia as Lecourt
Louis Viret as Viret
Michel Hildesheim as Billetsjoveren
Klaus Nielsen as Knud
Birgit Zacho as Pige med laktaske
Erik Gutheil as Speaker
Peter Kitter as Radiospeaker
Jørgen Beck as Løbskommissær

External links

1958 films
1958 drama films
Danish drama films
1950s Danish-language films
Danish black-and-white films
Films with screenplays by Erik Balling